Zhang Yong is a Chinese-born Singaporean billionaire business magnate who is the founder of the Haidilao restaurant group, best known for its chain of hot pot restaurants. At the end of 2018, Haidilao Hot Pot had 466 direct-operated stores in operation in more than a hundred cities. Zhang also holds majority stake in Haidilao Catering, Haidilao International Holding and Yihai International.

Biography 
Zhang Yong was born and grew up in Jianyang, Sichuan, China. He started work as a welder, and did not eat in a restaurant until he was 19.

In 1994, he quit his job in a tractor factory and opened a restaurant with 4 tables to seat customers,  the first Haidilao, which was cofounded by two couples, Zhang Yong and wife Shu Ping, and Shi Yonghong and wife Li Haiyan.

The restaurant quickly became the largest hotpot restaurant in town. A second restaurant, Lou Wai Lou, opened in 1998. In 2010, the company opened its own training school of restaurant management.

In 2013, Haidilao opened its first restaurant in the US, in Los Angeles, California.

In 2018, Haidilao filed for an initial public offering (IPO) at the Hong Kong Stock Exchange to raise capital of up to US$700 million for the company's global expansion.

Published work 
 Learn from Hai Di Lao, 2011

Personal life

Family
Zhang is married to Shu Ping, a co-founder and non-executive director of Sichuan Haidilao Catering and have a son. In 2018, Zhang and his family moved to Singapore, where he later became a naturalised citizen.

Wealth 
As of July 2021, Forbes estimated his net worth at US$15.8 billion, making him China's richest restaurateur. Forbes estimated in the same year that his fortune had fallen by US$2.4 billion after his company's stock value fell by 17%. He ranked #126 on Forbes' 2019 Billionaires list, making him the 3rd richest man in Singapore.

References

Living people
21st-century Chinese businesspeople
Billionaires from Sichuan
Businesspeople from Sichuan
Chinese billionaires
Chinese business executives
Chinese chief executives
Chinese company founders
Chinese restaurateurs
Restaurant founders
Year of birth missing (living people)
Singaporean billionaires
Singaporean chief executives
Singaporean business executives
Naturalised citizens of Singapore